Disappointment Pot is one of the entrances to the Gaping Gill cave system, located in a steep grassy shakehole some  south-east of Gaping Gill Main Shaft. Its mainly narrow stream passage descends a number of small shafts to enter the main system as a major inlet of Hensler's Master Cave. It lies within the designated Ingleborough Site of Special Scientific Interest.

Description

A  climb at the base of the grassy shakehole drops into a stream passage. Upstream, a climb enters a passage which after  leads to the stream sink and the Motley Pot exit. Downstream, a narrow meandering streamway leads to a short flat-out section, followed by a duck, a short section with minimal airspace. The passage becomes larger as it approaches the first of its five short pitches. Shortly before the third pitch, a high aven is where Marilyn, the third entrance, enters the system.

Motley Pot,, currently blocked, enters some small passages carrying the main stream from the adjacent sink to a  climb down just upstream of the main entrance.

A number of fossil and active inlet passages have been explored in the roof of the main streamway.

History

The cave was first entered by J. Blackburn-Holden and Eli Simpson in 1912, in the hope that it would prove to be another entrance into Gaping Gill, as had Flood Entrance Pot discovered not long before. They were disappointed to find that after  the cave terminated in a low water-filled crawl, hence its name. In 1944 Bob Leakey stripped naked and dived through the flooded passage at the end of Disappointment Pot which had previously stopped Simpson to find airspace where he could stand. He was then able to demolish a small dam of consolidated stones to lower the water level. This enabled the cave to be explored to the bottom.

Motley Pot was dug through by members of Bradford Pothole Club in 1984 to establish an entrance close to the stream sink. The third entrance, Marilyn was opened up members of Craven Pothole Club in 2005. A couple of pitches drop almost directly into Disappointment Pot (although the second pitch had been previously climbed from below in 1995 by members of Bradford Pothole Club).

References

External links
Online audio interview with Bob Leakey: "Passing the sump in Disappointment Pot Recorded 1984

Caves of North Yorkshire
Wild caves
Limestone caves